The 8th Directors Guild of America Awards, honoring the outstanding directorial achievements in film and television in 1955, were presented in 1956.

Winners and nominees

Film

Television

D.W. Griffith Award
 Henry King

External links
 

Directors Guild of America Awards
1955 film awards
1955 television awards
Direct
Direct
1955 awards in the United States